Fuyang is a town under the administration of Wuchuan Gelao and Miao Autonomous County, Guizhou, China. , it administers the following two residential neighborhoods and seven villages:
Neighborhoods
Fuyang Community
Dangyang Community

Villages
Xiaping Village
Shuiba Village
Yonghe Village
Qianjin Village
Heping Village
Shuanghe Village
Zhenzhu Village

References 

Township-level divisions of Guizhou
Wuchuan Gelao and Miao Autonomous County